A crux in climbing, mountaineering and high mountain touring is the most difficult section of a route, or the place where the greatest danger exists. In sport climbing and bouldering, the most technically challenging point in the climb is also called the crux section. In describing a climbing route using a topo, cruces (or cruxes) are usually shown with a key symbol.

That means the rest of the route might be considerably easier, however, a route may comprise several cruces of equal difficulty, or simply be a route of a very consistent level of difficulty with no sections that stand out as harder than the rest.

In planning a route it is important to know how far it is before the crux is reached, because cruces (or cruxes), can only be overcome with sufficient reserves of strength.  Sport climbers have come to use a kneebar to rest before, or immediately after, a crux; they can also continually practice a crux using top roping.

References 

Mountaineering
Climbing